"Here with Me" is a song recorded by singer Philip Bailey and released as a single in 1994 by Zoo Entertainment. It was produced by Brian McKnight and Robert Brookins. The song peaked at No. 33 on the Billboard Adult R&B Airplay chart.

Critical reception
Langston Wertz Jr. of Knight Ridder wrote "There's nothing show-stopping here, but nothing bad either. Brian McKnight wrote and produced four tracks, including the lead single Here With Me." Dan Kening of the Chicago Tribune said "Here with Me shows (Bailey's) four octave voice is still potent."

Personnel
Lead vocals – Philip Bailey
Backing vocals – Brian McKnight, Philip Bailey
Recording engineer (remix) – Donnell Sullivan
Recording engineer – Christopher Wood, Paul Clinberg
Produced, vocal arrangements and all instruments performed by Brian McKnight
Additional production by, keyboards and drums (remix) – Robert Brookins
Programmed by Brian McKnight, Mike McKnight
Remix – Donnell Sullivan, Robert Brookins

References

1994 singles
Philip Bailey songs
1994 songs
Songs written by Brian McKnight